Slalom is a studio album by American jazz saxophonist Jane Ira Bloom. The album was released in 1988 by Columbia label. Koch Jazz re-released the album in 1996. In the liner notes Bloom mentioned, "On this Compact Disc I tried to create a setting where the line between composed material and improvisation would disappear, so that simply the playing would come through. At the sessions, part of the challenge for a player was finding a creative edge on a number of pieces that weave in and out of the jazz tradition. Part of the challenge for our group was making it all flow."

Reception
Scott Yanow of AllMusic stated, "Jane Ira Bloom is teamed with pianist Fred Hersch in a quartet that explores a variety of melodic material in unexpected ways. Bloom, one of the top soprano saxophonists around and a creative user of electronics, has a fairly original tone and her improvisations are consistently full of surprises." A reviewer of The Crisis wrote, "Simplicity is her strong suit. The sound which she calls "jazz without a safety net" is so pleasant and comfortable that even non-jazz lovers are warming to it."

Track listing

Personnel
Jane Ira Bloom – soprano saxophone
Kent McLagan – double bass, electric bass
Tom Rainey – drums, percussion
Fred Hersch – piano

References

External links

Jane Ira Bloom albums
1988 albums
Columbia Records albums